Martina Bogleva (born 7 October 1993) is a Macedonian footballer who plays as a midfielder. She has been a member of the North Macedonia women's national team.

References

1993 births
Living people
Women's association football midfielders
Macedonian women's footballers
North Macedonia women's international footballers